Blossom is the first studio album by the punk band Frank Carter & the Rattlesnakes. It was released in 2015 through Kobalt Label Services.

Track listing

Personnel
Frank Carter & the Rattlesnakes
 Frank Carter – vocals, production
 Dean Richardson – guitar, production
 Thomas Mitchener – bass, production, engineering, mixing
 Memby Jago – drums, production

Additional personnel
Acle Kahney – mastering

Charts

References

2015 albums
Frank Carter & The Rattlesnakes albums